Hasbestan (also Romanized as Hasbestān; also known as Haspestān and Sabestān) is a village in Bakeshluchay Rural District, in the Central District of Urmia County, West Azerbaijan Province, Iran. At the 2006 census, its population was 59, in 17 families.

References 

Populated places in Urmia County